Jocelyn Barlow (26 August 1901 – 31 January 1975) was a British sports shooter. He competed at the 1948 Summer Olympics and 1952 Summer Olympics.

References

External links
 

1901 births
1975 deaths
British male sport shooters
Olympic shooters of Great Britain
Shooters at the 1948 Summer Olympics
Shooters at the 1952 Summer Olympics
Sport shooters from Pune
British people in colonial India
20th-century British people